Dzhamba is a rural locality (a selo) in Vostochny Selsoviet, Ikryaninsky District, Astrakhan Oblast, Russia. The population was 119 as of 2010. There are 2 streets.

Geography 
Dzhamba is located 14 km northwest of Ikryanoye (the district's administrative centre) by road. Vostochnoye is the nearest rural locality.

References 

Rural localities in Ikryaninsky District